The Negau helmets are 26 bronze helmets (23 of which are preserved) dating to c. 450 BC–350 BC, found in 1812 in a cache in Ženjak, near Negau, Duchy of Styria (now Negova, Slovenia). The helmets are of typical Etruscan 'vetulonic' shape, sometimes described as of the Negau type. It is not clear when they were buried, but they seem to have been left at the Ženjak site for ceremonial reasons. The village of Ženjak was of great interest to German archaeologists during the Nazi period and was briefly renamed Harigast during World War II. The site has never been excavated properly.

Inscriptions
On one of the helmets ("Negau B"), there is an inscription in a northern Etruscan alphabet. The date of the inscription is unclear, but it may be as old as 350–300 BC (Teržan 2012). It is read as:

harigastiteiva\\\ip
Many interpretations of the inscription have been proffered in the past, but the most recent interpretation is by Tom Markey (2001), who reads the inscription as Hariχasti teiva, 'Harigast the priest' (from *teiwaz 'god'), as another inscribed helmet also found at the site bears several names (mostly Celtic) followed by religious titles. Markey believes the text is Germanic mediated through Rhaetic which accounts for some of the difficulties in the reading, such as the lack of a declensional ending in the first element Hariχasti. In any case, the Germanic name Harigasti(z) is almost universally read. Formerly, some scholars have seen the inscription as an early incarnation of the runic alphabet, but it is now accepted that the script is North Etruscan proper, and precedes the formation of the Runic alphabet.

This inscription has been of particular interest to historical linguists, since it has been argued that it provides the earliest attestation of Grimm's law (also known as the First Germanic Sound Shift), the sound shift which distinguishes the Germanic languages from other Indo-European languages. If teiva is a Germanic cognate of Latin deus 'god', it would reflect Grimm's shift *d > *t. This would be the earliest attestation of the shift, which would have relevance for the dating. However Smith argues that there are major problems with seeing the helmet as conclusive evidence for such a development.

The four discrete inscriptions on the helmet usually called "Negau A" are read by Markey (2001) as: Dubni banuabi 'of Dubnos the pig-slayer'; sirago turbi 'astral priest of the troop'; Iars'e esvii 'Iarsus the divine'; and Kerup, probably an abbreviation for a Celtic name like Cerubogios.

See also
Meldorf fibula

References

 
 Teržan, B. 2012. ‘Negau (Negova), Slowenien: Benedikt V’, in S. Sievers, O.H. Urban and P.C. Ramsal (eds.), Lexikon zur keltischen Archäologie, pp. 1357-59. Vienna.

External links

 

5th-century BC works
4th-century BC works
1812 archaeological discoveries
Ancient helmets
Archaeological discoveries in Slovenia
Etruscan artefacts
Etruscan inscriptions
Iron Age
Individual helmets